The 2018 STP 500 was a Monster Energy NASCAR Cup Series race held on March 26, 2018, at Martinsville Speedway in Ridgeway, Virginia. Contested over 500 laps on the .526 mile (.847 km) paperclip-shaped short track, it was sixth race of the 2018 Monster Energy NASCAR Cup Series season. The race was postponed from Sunday, March 25 to Monday, March 26 due to snow accumulation in Martinsville.

Report

Background

Martinsville Speedway is an International Speedway Corporation-owned NASCAR stock car racing track located in Henry County, in Ridgeway, Virginia, just to the south of Martinsville. At  in length, it is the shortest track in the Monster Energy NASCAR Cup Series. The track was also one of the first paved oval tracks in NASCAR, being built in 1947 by H. Clay Earles. It is also the only remaining race track that has been on the NASCAR circuit from its beginning in 1948.

Entry list

Practice

First practice

Final practice

Qualifying
Qualifying for Saturday was cancelled due to snow and Martin Truex Jr., the point leader, was awarded the pole as a result.

Starting Lineup

Race

Stage Results

Stage One
Laps: 130

Stage Two
Laps: 130

Final Stage Results

Stage Three
Laps: 240

Race statistics
 Lead changes: 6 among different drivers
 Cautions/Laps: 4 for 33
 Red flags: 0
 Time of race: 3 hours, 13 minutes and 14 seconds
 Average speed:

Media

Television
Fox Sports was covering their 18th race at the Martinsville Speedway. Mike Joy, nine-time Martinsville winner Jeff Gordon and 11-time Martinsville winner Darrell Waltrip called in the booth for the race. Jamie Little, Vince Welch and Matt Yocum handled pit road duties for the entire race.

Radio
MRN had the radio call for the race which would also be simulcasted on Sirius XM NASCAR Radio. Joe Moore, Jeff Striegle and seven-time Martinsville winner Rusty Wallace called the race in the booth as the cars were on the frontstretch. Dave Moody called the race from atop the turn 3 stands as the field is racing down the backstretch. Alex Hayden, Winston Kelley and Steve Post worked pit road for the radio side.

Standings after the race

Drivers' Championship standings

Manufacturers' Championship standings

Note: Only the first 16 positions are included for the driver standings.

References

STP 500
STP 500
STP 500
NASCAR races at Martinsville Speedway